Compose is a private, Database-as-a-Service (DBaaS) platform for securely hosting and managing shared and dedicated MongoDB instances. Compose is used by a majority of the cloud hosting service Heroku's MongoDB users, being the only remote Mongo host for over a year.

History
Compose is an alumnus of the Y Combinator business incubator, Summer 2011 class.

In July 2011, Compose announced it received its first round of angel investment of $417,000 from Y Combinator, Lerer And SV Angel. Shortly thereafter, MongoHQ acquired the competing Mongo host and automated provisioning software of MongoMachines.

Compose currently integrates with 4 PaaS providers, with more slated in the future.

They were named #4 in the top "10 Enterprise Cloud App Services of 2011" by Read Write Web.

In August 2014, Compose renamed their company from MongoHQ.

In July 2015, Compose was acquired by IBM

See also
Cloud database
NoSQL
PAAS
Big data
Document database

References

External links
 

NoSQL
Cloud computing providers
IBM acquisitions